Neelagiri (English: The Blue Mountain, in reference to the town Neelagiri) is a 1991 Malayalam film directed by I. V. Sasi and written by Ranjith, starring Mammootty, Sunitha, Madhoo, M. G. Soman, Anju and Srividya. The music was composed by M. M. Keeravani, credited as Maragathamani. The film was a box office hit.

Cast
 Mammootty as Sivan
 Madhoo as Anitha/Anu Mol
 Sunitha as Lakshmi
 Raghu as Muthu
 Anju as Usha
 M. G. Soman as Shekhara Menon
 Srividya as Radha menon
 Sangeeta as Ani's mother	 
 Shanavas as Sekhar
 Kuthiravattam Pappu as Arumukhan
 Aloor Elsy as Arumughan's Wife
 Augustine as Rajappan
 Jagannatha Varma as CI Varma
 Shivaji as Ani's father
 Mala Aravindan as Chackochan
 Bheeman Raghu as Chandru
 Manu Varma as Arun
 Raja as Rankan
 Adoor Pankajam-muthiyamma

References

External links
 
 http://popcorn.oneindia.in/title/5636/neelagiri.html

1990s Malayalam-language films
1991 action films
1991 films
Films scored by M. M. Keeravani
Films directed by I. V. Sasi
Indian action films
Films shot in Ooty